RTX may refer to:

Science and technology
 Radiation therapy, is therapy using ionizing radiation, generally as part of cancer treatment to control or kill malignant cells
 Resiniferatoxin, a natural, high-potency ligand that activates the capsaicin (VR1, TRPV1) receptor
 Rituximab, a monoclonal antibody used in the treatment of leukemia, lymphomas, transplant rejection and autoimmune disorders
 RTX2010, a radiation-hardened microprocessor which has been used in numerous spacecraft
 RTX toxin (repeats in toxin), a type of toxin secreted by Gram-negative bacteria

Computing
 Ray tracing (graphics), sometimes abbreviated RTX
 Nvidia GeForce RTX, a series of Nvidia graphic cards in the Nvidia GeForce brand
 .rtx (ring tone XML file extension), of the Ring Tone Transfer Language
 RTX (operating system), a real-time operating system extension for Microsoft Windows
 Keil RTX, a real-time operating system (RTOS) for ARM devices

Other uses
 RTX, a band formed by Jennifer Herrema
 RTX (event), a video game and internet convention held annually in three cities
 RTX Red Rock, a 2003 action-adventure game for the PlayStation 2, which was developed and published by LucasArts
 RTX, the stock ticker symbol of Raytheon Technologies